Luís Filipe Marques Amado, GCC (born 17 September 1953) is a portuguese politician who served as Minister of Foreign Affairs from 2006 to 2011 in Portugal's  XIII Government led by the Socialist Party. Before replacing Diogo Freitas do Amaral as Minister of Foreign Affairs, on 30 June 2006, Amado had served as Minister of Defence.  On 30 June 2007, he succeeded to the EU Council Presidency on behalf of Portugal.

Education and personal life
Luís Amado graduated in economics from the Technical University of Lisbon, before becoming an advisor to the Portuguese National Defence Institute and Visiting Professor of Georgetown University. Married with two children, he has lived much of his life in Madeira, where he serves as a Deputy in the Regional Assembly.

Government posts
 Deputy Secretary of State of Internal Administration, in the XIII Government. (1995–1997)
 Secretary of State for Foreign Affairs and Cooperation, in the XIII Government. (1997–1999)
 Secretary of State for Foreign Affairs and Cooperation, in the XIV Government. (1999–2002)
 Minister of Defence, in the XVII Government. (2005–2006)
 Minister of State and Foreign Affairs, in the XVII Government. (2006–2009)
 Minister of State and Foreign Affairs, in the XVIII Government. (2009–2011)

By late 2010, Amado was widely expected to be replaced after he had called for the centre-left Socialists to form a coalition government with the centre-right Social Democrats (PSD), the main opposition party at the time; Sócrates did not endorse the proposal.

Other activities
 Center for International Relations and Sustainable Development (CIRSD), Member of the Board of Advisors
 European Council on Foreign Relations (ECFR), Member

Honours
 Grand Officier of the National Order of Merit, France (29 November 1999)
  Grand Cross of the Order of Merit, Greece (17 March 2000)
  Grand Cross of the Order of Isabella the Catholic, Spain (28 September 2000)
  Grand Cross of the Order of Leopold II, Belgium (9 October 2000)
  Grand Cross of the Order of May, Merit Class, Argentina (18 June 2003)
  Grand Cross of the Order of the Lithuanian Grand Duke Gediminas, Lithuania (20 June 2007)
  Grand Cross of the Order of Civil Merit, Spain (22 October 2007)
 Extraordinary Grand Cross of the National Order of Merit, Paraguay (7 December 2007)
 Commander Grand Cross of the Order of the Polar Star, Sweden (16 May 2008)
 Grand Cross with Star of the Order of Merit, Poland (3 March 2009)
 Grand Cross of the Order of Christ, Portugal (8 April 2009)
 Grand Cross with Star of the Order of Merit, Germany (26 May 2009)
 Grand Cross of the Order of the Star of Jordan, Jordan (28 May 2009)
 Grand Cross of Royal Norwegian Order of Merit, Norway (25 September 2009)
 Grand Cross of Order of Merit, Chile (31 August 2010)
 Grand Cross of Order of St. Gregory the Great, Holy See (3 September 2010)
 Grand Cross of the Order pro Merito Melitensi, Sovereign Military Order of Malta (23 November 2010)
 Grand Cross of the Order of the Oak Crown, Luxembourg (6 December 2010)

External links
 Biography on Portugal.gov.pt

References

|-

|-

1953 births
Living people
Technical University of Lisbon alumni
Socialist Party (Portugal) politicians
Foreign ministers of Portugal
Ministers of National Defence of Portugal
Government ministers of Portugal
Grand Crosses 1st class of the Order of Merit of the Federal Republic of Germany
Grand Officers of the Ordre national du Mérite
Knights Grand Cross of the Order of Isabella the Catholic
Recipients of the Order pro Merito Melitensi